Moses Emmanuel (born 9 August 1989) is an English semi-professional footballer who last played as a striker for Hayes & Yeading United. He was previously known as Moses Ademola.

Early career
Emmanuel joined Cray Wanderers at a young age and eventually left in 2004. After scoring 19 goals for Croydon Athletic in the Isthmian League Division One South in the 2007–08 season, Emmanuel was spotted by scouts from teams in the Football League.

Club career

Brentford

Emmanuel consequently, went on trial with Charlton Athletic and Brentford. He signed his first professional deal with the latter in May 2008. His transfer fee was reportedly £2,500, paid by the Brentford fanzine "Thorne in the Side".

Welling United

The striker was loaned to Conference South side Welling United in November 2008, but was recalled by Brentford without making an appearance. He returned to Park View Road in December 2008, and made four appearances in the league, scoring once. The loan spell was extended for a further month in early January 2009, but just three days later, the decision was reversed, and Ademola returned to Griffin Park.

Woking

Emmanuel joined Woking on loan the following season. On 29 January 2010, he made his loan move permanent by signing a contract with Woking, then staying on for the 2010–11 season. In July 2011, it was confirmed that Ademola would be spending another season at the club.

Eastleigh and Bromley

On 12 July 2012, Emmanuel joined another Conference South club, Eastleigh. He left Eastleigh on 27 November for divisional rivals Dover Athletic, while being the club's joint top scorer for the 2012–13 season having scored 7 goals in 15 league appearances. He left the club in May 2014 after turning down a new contract and subsequently joining Bromley. After scoring three times in pre-season, Ademola scored Bromley's opening goal of the league season, in a 3–1 away win against Havant & Waterlooville. He was a key figure in Bromley's title winning season in 2014–15, and continued his fine form in the National League, including a hattrick in a 7–3 victory over Torquay United. He left Bromley after his contract expired in the summer of 2016.

Dover Athletic

After a two-week trial at Gillingham, Emmanuel eventually re-signed for Dover Athletic on 5 Aug 2016.

Sutton United

In May 2017, Emmanuel signed a deal with Sutton United. He made his club debut on 8 August 2017 in a 1–0 away defeat to Eastleigh before scoring his first goal for the U's on 15 August in a 2–1 home victory over Macclesfield Town. He joined Maidenhead United on loan in October 2017.

Billericay Town
Emmanuel joined Billericay Town for the 2018–19 season. In his first season at the club, he scored 25 goals, 17 in the league and eight in cup competitions, and finished the season as the club's top scorer. In total, he scored 30 goals in 63 games for Billericay.

Welling United
Emmanuel joined Welling United on 22 November 2019.

Wealdstone
After seven appearances for Welling, Emmanuel joined Wealdstone on 10 January 2020. He went on to score 4 times in 9 games as Wealdstone won the National League South title. On 6 October 2020, Emmanuel scored Wealdstone's first goal in the National League for 32 years, converting a penalty in the opening game of the season against Yeovil Town. He would go on to miss much of the second half of the 2020-21 season due to being furloughed, and subsequently left Wealdstone at the end of the season, having scored a total of 11 goals for the club.

Hayes & Yeading United
Emmanuel joined Hayes & Yeading United for 2021–22.

Football Icon 2
Whilst at Croydon, Emmanuel was a finalist in the Sky TV reality show, Football Icon 2 in which young players competed for a contract at Chelsea.

Career statistics

References

External links

Living people
1989 births
Association football forwards
Brentford F.C. players
Welling United F.C. players
Cray Wanderers F.C. players
Croydon Athletic F.C. players
Woking F.C. players
Eastleigh F.C. players
Canvey Island F.C. players
Bromley F.C. players
Dover Athletic F.C. players
Sutton United F.C. players
Maidenhead United F.C. players
Billericay Town F.C. players
Wealdstone F.C. players
Hayes & Yeading United F.C. players
Black British sportspeople
Footballers from Lewisham
English people of Yoruba descent
English people of Nigerian descent
Yoruba sportspeople
English Football League players
National League (English football) players
Isthmian League players
Southern Football League players
English footballers